The American War Mothers was founded in 1917 and given a Congressional charter on February 24, 1925. It is a perpetual patriotic, 501(c) 4 non-profit, non-political, non-sectarian, non-partisan organization whose members are mothers of children who have served or are serving in the Armed Services during a time of conflict.

National President: LaVerna Capes

Notable members
 Jeanette Lawrence
 Agnes Thomas Morris, president of War Mothers of America, 1918-1920

See also

Blue Star Mothers Club
American Gold Star Mothers

References

External links

 To Incorporate the American War Mothers : hearings before the United States House Committee on the Judiciary, and Senate Committee on the Judiciary, Sixty-Eighth Congress, first session, on May 6, 1924.
Fountain a reminder of American War Mothers' work - Pantagraph (Bloomington, Illinois newspaper)

United States military support organizations
Organizations established in 1917
Patriotic and national organizations chartered by the United States Congress
History of women in the United States
Women's organizations based in the United States
Maternity in the United States